101 Aquarii (abbreviated 101 Aqr) is a star in the equatorial constellation of Aquarius. 101 Aquarii is the Flamsteed designation, although it also bears the Bayer designation b3 Aquarii. The combined apparent visual magnitude of the pair is 4.71, which is bright enough to be seen with the naked eye from the suburbs. The distance of this star from Earth is estimated as  based upon parallax measurements.

The brighter member of this system has an apparent magnitude of 4.81. It is an A-type main sequence star with a stellar classification of A0 V. This star is spinning rapidly with a projected rotational velocity of 1 km/s. The fainter companion is a magnitude 7.43 star at an angular separation of 0.840 arcseconds.

References

External links
 Image 101 Aquarii

Aquarii, b3
Aquarii, 101
221565
Aquarius (constellation)
Binary stars
A-type main-sequence stars
116247
Bright Star Catalogue objects
BD-21 6437